Procrimima procris is a moth in the subfamily Arctiinae. It was described by Felder in 1875. It is found in Colombia and Peru.

References

Moths described in 1875
Lithosiini